Al Bidda SC  is a Qatari football team representing the Al Bidda district of Doha City playing in the Qatari Second Division. It was officially granted club status by the Qatar Football Association in September 2018, allowing it to participate in the 2018–19 season of the Qatari Second Division.

Current squad

As of Qatari Second Division:

References

External links
 Al Bidda SC at Mundial11.com

Bidda
2015 establishments in Qatar
Association football clubs established in 2015